The athletics competition at the 2011 Southeast Asian Games was held from 12 to 16 November at the Jakabaring Stadium in Palembang, Indonesia. Over the five-day competition a total of 46 events were contested  with 23 contests for each gender, matching the Olympic athletics program minus the men's 50 km race walk. Six  SEA Games records were broken and twenty national records were surpassed.

Thailand – traditionally dominant in the competition – again had the highest number of gold medals in athletics, winning fourteen events and taking 32 medals overall. The host nation Indonesia was a close second with thirteen golds and won the most medals with a total of 36. Vietnam were a clear third with nine golds and 32 medals. Seven of the eleven competing nations reached the medal table.

The 26th edition saw athletes continue successful streaks at the competition: Filipino Rene Herrera won his fifth consecutive men's steeplechase gold medal, his teammate Marestella Torres won her fourth long jump title (with the second longest jump in Asia so far in 2011), and Theerayut Philakong of Thailand won a fourth straight title in the men's triple jump.  Thai athlete Wassana Winatho and James Wong Tuck Yi of Singapore each won their tenth Southeast Asian Games gold medals of their careers at the competition.

Indonesia's Triyaningsih demonstrated her regional dominance in women's long-distance running: after two 5000/10,000 m doubles in 2007 and 2009, she again won both track events and also the women's marathon race. Agus Prayogo won a 5000/10,000 m men's double and Yahuza's win in the men's marathon made it a long-distance sweep for Indonesia. Two other athletes completed event doubles: Franklin Burumi of Indonesia won the 100 and 200 metres finals, while Truong Thanh Hang repeated her 800/1500 metres double for a third consecutive edition.

The final runner on Malaysia's 4×400 m relay team, Muhamad Yunus Lasaleh, tested positive for banned substances at the competition.

Medal summary

Men

† : Malaysia's Mohd Jironi Riduan finished third in the 1500 m but was disqualified for pulling on another athlete's shirt.
†† : Malaysia's final leg runner in the 400 m relay failed a drug test at the competition and was later banned.

Women

Medal table

References

Results
Medal Audit For SEA Games XXVI 2011 Palembang Jakarta Indonesia 11-22 November 2011 - Athletics. 2011 SEA Games. Retrieved on 2011-11-16.
Medal table
Medal Tally For Athletics. 2011 SEA Games. Retrieved on 2011-11-16.

External links
Official website

2011
Southeast Asian Games
2011 Southeast Asian Games events
International athletics competitions hosted by Indonesia